Sendai Bay is a bay from the Oshika Peninsula of Miyagi Prefecture to  of Fukushima Prefecture.

References 

Bays of Japan
Landforms of Miyagi Prefecture